Coxville, also known as Roseville, is an unincorporated community in Florida Township, Parke County, in the U.S. state of Indiana.

History
Coxville was named in honor of William Cox, the operator of a nearby mill.

Geography

References

Unincorporated communities in Indiana
Unincorporated communities in Parke County, Indiana